Lithos is a peer-reviewed academic journal, publishing original research papers on the petrology, geochemistry and petrogenesis of igneous and metamorphic rocks. Lithos is a hybrid open-access journal and publishes both subscription and open access articles.

References

English-language journals
Geology journals
Elsevier academic journals